Kupellonura werawera is a species of crustacean of the order Isopoda. The holotype was collected from Orpheus Island, Queensland, but its wider distribution is unknown.

References

Isopoda